John B. Smith may refer to:

 John B. Smith (Washington politician), American politician
 John B. Smith (Wisconsin politician), American politician
 John Baptist Smith (1843–1923), Confederate States Army officer
 John Benjamin Smith (1796–1879), British politician
 John Bernhardt Smith (1858–1912), American entomologist
 John Blair Smith (1764–1799), president of Union College
 John Brown Smith (1837–?), American anarchist
 John Butler Smith (1838–1914), American politician